Somparn Champisri (born 18 January 1943) is a Thai former tennis player active in the 1960s and 1970s.

Career
Champisri, a team silver medalist at the 1966 Asian Games, also won numerous Southeast Asian Games medals for Thailand. He is the only Thai man to win three Southeast Asian Games singles gold medals (1965, 1971 & 1973). In 1966 he won the singles title at the Malayan Championships held in Ipoh, Malaysia.

A left-handed player, Champisri competed for the Thailand Davis Cup team from 1976 to 1978.

References

External links
 
 

1943 births
Living people
Somparn Champisri
Asian Games medalists in tennis
Somparn Champisri
Tennis players at the 1966 Asian Games
Medalists at the 1966 Asian Games
Southeast Asian Games medalists in tennis
Somparn Champisri
Somparn Champisri
Somparn Champisri
Competitors at the 1965 Southeast Asian Peninsular Games
Competitors at the 1971 Southeast Asian Peninsular Games
Competitors at the 1973 Southeast Asian Peninsular Games
Competitors at the 1977 Southeast Asian Games
Somparn Champisri